Miriama Jennet Kamo (born 19 October 1973) is a New Zealand journalist, children's author and television presenter. She currently presents TVNZ's flagship current affairs programme Sunday, and Māori current affairs programme Marae.

Early life 

Miriama was born in Christchurch in 1973. She attended New Brighton Catholic Primary School and Aranui High School. She graduated from the University of Canterbury with a Bachelor of Arts in English in 1995.

Career 
Kamo studied at CPIT and within her first year, landed her first television job, as a reporter and presenter on children's science programme Get Real. She later moved to Wellington, where she worked as a reporter for the critically acclaimed arts and issues show backch@t; after that programme ended, she briefly moved to Sydney, where she held various jobs, eventually becoming assistant manager of an art gallery.

Kamo returned to New Zealand in 2001; in 2002, she joined Television New Zealand (TVNZ), becoming a reporter for current affairs programme, Sunday. She has also worked as a fill-in presenter for 1 News and Breakfast. From 2005 to 2011, she hosted TVNZ's current affairs show 20/20; from 2008 to 2012, she was a weekend anchor for TVNZ 7's News at 8. In 2010, Kamo and fellow presenter Rawdon Christie anchored the live coverage of the aftermath of the 2010 Canterbury earthquake. From 2015 to 2016, Kamo hosted Kiwi Living, a lifestyle programme on TVNZ.

Since 2011, Kamo has been the host of TVNZ's current affairs shows Sunday, Māori current affairs programme Marae, and the online technology and innovation series Sunday Innovate.

Kamo writes for various publications, and her first children's book, The Stolen Stars of Matariki, was published by Scholastic in early 2018.

Recognition 
In 2005, Kamo won Best Current Affairs Reporter at the Qantas Television Awards for her investigation into alleged abuses at Porirua Hospital in the 1960s and 70s. The judging panel noted that she "demonstrated excellent reporter/talent rapport with strong interest and emotional content." Reflecting in 2022, Kamo commented that the programme on Porirua Hospital, which she did early in her career, was one of the stories that left the "biggest impression on her...[and]...was a watershed for her, not just as a journalist, but as a person."
 
In 2019, Stolen Stars of Matariki was a finalist in New Zealand Post Book Awards, Children & Young Adults: Te Kura Pounamu Award for books written completely in te reo Māori.

Kamo won Best Reporter - Maori Affairs in the 2019 Voyager Media Awards for her work on two New Zealand television programmes, Marae and Sunday.

Personal life 
Kamo married consultant and Treaty of Waitangi negotiator Michael Dreaver in 2015; they have one daughter, born in 2011. She is of Ngāi Tahu and Ngāti Mutunga heritage.

See also
 List of New Zealand television personalities

References 

Living people
Ngāi Tahu people
Ngāti Mutunga people
New Zealand television presenters
New Zealand women television presenters
People from Christchurch
University of Canterbury alumni
1973 births
New Zealand Māori broadcasters
New Zealand Māori women
People educated at Aranui High School
New Zealand children's writers
21st-century New Zealand women writers
New Zealand women children's writers
New Zealand television newsreaders and news presenters